Mitzpe Netofa is a religious community settlement in northern Israel. Located adjacent to the Arab village Tur'an, it falls under the jurisdiction of the Lower Galilee Regional Council.

History
The village was founded in 1981.

References

External links
Mitzpe Netofa community website

Community settlements
Religious Israeli communities
Nahal settlements
Populated places in Northern District (Israel)
Populated places established in 1981
1981 establishments in Israel